is a Japanese politician of the New Komeito Party, a member of the House of Councillors in the Diet (national legislature). A native of Osaka, Osaka and graduate of Keio University, he was elected to the House of Councillors for the first time in 2004 after working at Fuji Television where he produced news and opinion shows.

References

External links 
 Official website in Japanese.

Members of the House of Councillors (Japan)
Keio University alumni
Living people
1948 births
People from Osaka
New Komeito politicians